A Beast at Bay is a 1912 silent short film directed by D. W. Griffith. It was produced and distributed by the Biograph Company. Preserved in paper print form at the Library of Congress.

This film is in the Public Domain

Plot 
A young woman believes her boyfriend is cowardly after he backs down from an argument, but when the she is kidnapped, her boyfriend rescues her and she changes her mind.

Cast
Mary Pickford – The Young Woman
Edwin August – The Young Woman's Ideal
Alfred Paget – The Convict
Mae Marsh – The Young Woman's Friend

Rest of cast
Elmer Booth – unconfirmed
Christy Cabanne – Station Master
William A. Carroll – Guard
Francis J. Grandon – unconfirmed
Robert Harron – A Farmer
J. Jiquel Lanoe – At Station
Henry Lehrman – A Guard
Charles Hill Mailes – Guard
Marguerite Marsh – (*billed Marguerite Loveridge)
Lottie Pickford – unconfirmed
W. C. Robinson – Guard

References

External links

A Beast at Bay available for free download at Internet Archive

1912 films
American silent short films
American black-and-white films
Films directed by D. W. Griffith
Silent American drama films
1912 drama films
1912 short films
1910s American films
American drama short films